Xylonic acid is a sugar acid that can be obtained by oxidation of the hemiacetal/aldehyde group of xylose. The C-2 epimer is known as lyxonic acid.

References

Sugar acids
Monosaccharides